M28, M-28, or M/28 may refer to:

 M-28 (Michigan highway), a state highway in Michigan
 M28/M-1928 Haversack, US army Haversack
 M28 Mosin–Nagant, a Finnish rifle
 Tromboncino M28 grenade launcher, an Italian weapon that attaches to a rifle
 Miles M.28 Mercury, a 1941 British aircraft 
 PZL M28 Skytruck, a small Polish transport plane
 Messier 28, a globular cluster in the constellation Sagittarius
 McLaren M28, a Formula One racing car
 M28 (Cape Town), a Metropolitan Route in Cape Town, South Africa
 M28 (Pretoria), a Metropolitan Route in Pretoria, South Africa
 A line of 28-volt power tools manufactured by Milwaukee Electric Tool Corporation
 M28 is a training rocket for the M270 Multiple Launch Rocket System where the warhead is replaced by a steel ballast and three smoke canisters.